"Today Was a Fairytale" is a song written and recorded by American singer-songwriter Taylor Swift. Produced by Swift and Nathan Chapman, it was released digitally on January 19, 2010, by Big Machine Records as a single from the corresponding soundtrack for the 2010 film Valentine's Day, in which she acted. Swift had previously written the song and offered it to producers for the film's soundtrack. Musically, "Today Was a Fairytale" is country pop-influenced and, lyrically, speaks of a magical date.

It received generally positive reviews from contemporary critics, some who deemed it the best song on the soundtrack, and enjoyed commercial success by reaching the top ten in three countries. In Canada, "Today Was a Fairytale" became Swift's first number-one song. The song debuted and peaked at number two on the Billboard Hot 100. Swift promoted "Today Was a Fairytale" at several venues and included it on a revised set list for the continuation of her Fearless Tour in 2010. The song was re-recorded as part of Swift's re-recorded version of her 2008 album Fearless, released in 2021.

Background and release
Swift solely penned "Today Was a Fairytale" in the summer of 2008 and stored it away for a while. After being cast as Felicia Miller on Valentine's Day, Swift offered the song to the film producers for the soundtrack as she did not believe it fit on her upcoming album. "When this movie opportunity came about, I reached back into my pocket and thought, 'I think this is perfect for the soundtrack. I hope it's perfect for the soundtrack'", Swift told The Tennessean. "Today Was a Fairytale" was released as a single from the Valentine's Day soundtrack on January 19, 2010, exclusively through the iTunes Store. The single was re-released on February 15, 2011. Swift released a re-recorded version, "Today Was a Fairytale (Taylor's Version)", as the twentieth track on her re-recorded album Fearless (Taylor's Version), on April 9, 2021.

Composition
"Today Was a Fairytale" has a length of four minutes and two seconds. It is set in common time and has a ballad tempo of 80 beats per minute. It is written in the key of G major and Swift's vocals span a little more than one octave, from G3 to C5. It follows the chord progression G–C–Em–D. Jody Rosen and Jonas Weiner of Slate magazine noted that although Swift typically sings country pop, "with the possible exception of that woodsy acoustic guitar" in the song's introduction "Today Was a Fairytale" displays no aspects of country music in either its instrumentation or vocals. "Taylor's vowels have gotten flattened and Yankee-ified," commented Rosen, though Weiner pointed out that Swift's pop-heavy music was the primary reason for her success. Hannah Mylrea from NME, meanwhile, described it as a country song. Melanie Bertoldi of Billboard believed Swift's vocals displayed a newfound maturity. There are two different versions of the song's intro: the first one having much more electronic production while the second one is only accompanied by an acoustic guitar.

The song's lyrics describe a magical date. Like many of Swift's songs, the lyrics invoke princess imagery with lines such as "Today was a fairytale/You were the prince/I used to be a damsel in distress." Bertoldi said the lyrics were "driven more by sweeping emotion than [...] specific, youth-focused imagery". Occasionally, Swift does interrupt the fairytale construct with modern day, real world details like the time her date arrives or the color of his shirt.

Critical reception
The song received generally positive reviews from contemporary critics. Melanie Bertoldi of Billboard compared the song's lyrics to those of Swift's previous singles "You Belong with Me" and "Fifteen"; she was convinced that "Today Was a Fairytale" would "help [Swift] reach an even broader audience." Leah Greenblatt of Entertainment Weekly did not see a departure from Swift, recalling lyrics to be familiar of those of "Love Story" and "You Belong with Me". However, she ended with "What do we know? The song sounds Taylor-made (oh, the wit!) for her fans, and we’re just happy she's still sweet, neat, and [...] age-appropriate." An uncredited review from People magazine said the track led the Valentine's Day soundtrack. Brittany Talarico of British magazine OK! called the song's refrains "catchy" and described the overall feel as "sweet." Andrew Leahey of AllMusic said that there was special attention placed on Swift's tracks on the soundtrack, particularly on the song. Jody Rosen of Slate magazine declared "Today Was a Fairytale" "track of the week", highlighting its imagery that, according to her, "sharpen the focus instead of softening it." Jonah Weiner, also of Slate, wrote, "This song is a funny mix: some of her tightest songwriting to date, but some of her laziest lyrics." He mentioned that in the lyrics, Swift mainly "invoke[d] the cliché and hope[d] it [did] her heavy lifting for her." In June 2022, Insider ranked "Today Was a Fairytale" as Swift's second worst soundtrack song.

Commercial performance
On the week ending February 6, 2010, "Today Was a Fairytale" debuted at number two on the Billboard Hot 100 (blocked from number one by Kesha's "Tik Tok"). This was due to the sales of 325,000 digital downloads, which broke the record for largest first-week download sales by a female artist previously set by Britney Spears' "Womanizer" (the current record is held by Adele, with her 2015 single "Hello" selling 1.11 million downloads in its first week). In the succeeding week, the song descended to number twenty-two. It spent a total of eighteen weeks on the chart. "Today Was a Fairytale" additionally peaked at number one on the Billboard Digital Song Sales chart, number 20 on the Mainstream Top 40 chart, number 21 on the Adult Contemporary chart, and number 41 on the Hot Country Songs chart,. It was certified platinum by the Recording Industry Association of America (RIAA) for the sales of over one million units. As of November 2014, "Today Was a Fairytale" has sold 1.6 million digital downloads in the United States. On the week ending February 20, 2010, "Today Was a Fairytale" debuted at number one on the Canadian Hot 100, becoming Swift's first number-one single in Canada.

The song debuted at number six on the Australian Singles Chart on the week ending February 21, 2010. It ascended to its peak position at number three in the following week. The song spent twelve weeks upon the chart before falling off on the week ending May 9, 2010. "Today Was a Fairytale" was certified platinum by the Australian Recording Industry Association (ARIA) for the sales of 70,000 units. In New Zealand, "Today Was a Fairytale" debuted at number thirty-seven, and peaked at number twenty-nine. The song peaked at number sixty-three on the Japan Hot 100. In Europe, "Today Was a Fairytale" charted at number forty-one in Ireland, and number fifty-seven in the United Kingdom.

Live performances

Swift performed a medley, which included the song, at the 52nd Grammy Awards. Wearing casual white blouse and black skinny jeans, Swift performed "Today Was a Fairytale", where she took center stage with a wooden acoustic guitar strapped to her shoulder. After performing the track, she announced. "It's a fairy tale and an honor to share the stage with Stevie Nicks". Following, the two performed a cover of Fleetwood Mac's "Rhiannon" (1976). Swift and Nicks then jumped into the third and final part in her medley, a twangy version of "You Belong with Me". Eric Ditzian of MTV News was disappointed at Swift's and Nicks' harmonies, but said the two "made for a compelling twosome". The performance followed much backlash in regards to Swift's off key singing, which caused Scott Borchetta, CEO of Big Machine Records, to issue a statement defending the performance.

Swift annexed "Today Was a Fairytale" to a revised set list for the continuation of her Fearless Tour in 2010. During the performances, which was the penultimate of each concert, Swift was usually costumed in a black cocktail dress with a v-neck cut and black, leather boots. She performed with a rhinestoned acoustic guitar center-stage as a forest was projected on the stage; concluding the performance, clips from Valentine's Day were depicted and, following its completion, confetti dropped from the ceiling. At the May 22, 2010 concert at the Air Canada Centre in Toronto, Ontario, Canada, Jane Stevenson of The Toronto Sun said that Swift wearing a Toronto Maple Leafs jersey "didn't hurt [her] popularity either in this hockey-mad town." Molly Trust of Billboard noted the performance at the tour's final concert on June 5, 2010 at Gillette Stadium in Foxborough, Massachusetts "sported a touch of a hometown feel, as Swift literally and figuratively played to the crowd in a Patriots shirt." In 2013, Swift performed the song, in place of "I Almost Do", during the Miami show of The Red Tour.

Chart performance

Weekly charts

Year-end charts

Certifications

Release history

See also
List of Billboard Hot 100 top-ten singles in 2010
List of number-one digital songs of 2010 (U.S.)
List of Hot 100 number-one singles of 2010 (Canada)
List of number-one music downloads of 2010 (Canada)

References

2010s ballads
2010 singles
Canadian Hot 100 number-one singles
Songs written by Taylor Swift
Taylor Swift songs
Song recordings produced by Taylor Swift
Song recordings produced by Nathan Chapman (record producer)
Song recordings produced by Chris Rowe
Big Machine Records singles